Here's to My Lady is a 1978 studio album by the American jazz singer Rosemary Clooney, recorded in tribute to Billie Holiday.

Track listing
 "I Cover the Waterfront" (Johnny Green, Edward Heyman) – 3:35
 "Good Morning Heartache" (Ervin Drake, Dan Fisher, Irene Higginbotham) – 4:19
 "Mean to Me" (Fred E. Ahlert, Roy Turk) – 3:46
 "Lover Man (Oh Where Can You Be?)" (Jimmy Davis, Ram Ramirez, James Sherman) – 4:32
 "Don't Explain" (Arthur Herzog, Jr., Billie Holiday) – 4:44
 "Comes Love" (Lew Brown, Sam H. Stept, Charles Tobias) – 4:46
 "He's Funny That Way" (Neil Moret, Richard A. Whiting) – 4:38
 "God Bless the Child" (Herzog, Holiday) – 2:24
 "Them There Eyes" (Maceo Pinkard, Doris Tauber, William Tracey) – 2:35
 "Everything Happens to Me" (Tom Adair, Matt Dennis) – 5:30

Personnel

Performance
 Rosemary Clooney – vocal
 Cal Collins – guitar
 Scott Hamilton – tenor saxophone
 Warren Vaché – cornet
 Nat Pierce – piano
 Monty Budwig – double bass
 Jake Hanna – drums

References

1978 albums
Rosemary Clooney albums
Albums produced by Carl Jefferson
Concord Records albums
Billie Holiday tribute albums